Boro Jovanović (born 21 October 1939) is a former Yugoslav tennis player. Jovanović was runner-up in the 1962 Wimbledon doubles tournament with Nikola Pilić, and quarter-finalist in the 1968 Wimbledon doubles tournament. In singles, Jovanović reached the final of the 1963 Italian Open and the quarterfinals of the 1968 French Open. In 1972, Boro Jovanović joined the World Championship Tennis Tour.

He was ranked World No. 8 for 1963 by Lance Tingay of The Daily Telegraph.

Grand Slam finals

Doubles: ( 1 runner-up)

References

External links 
 
 
 
 Zagrebački gospodin 

1939 births
Living people
Croatian male tennis players
Yugoslav male tennis players
Tennis players from Zagreb
Mediterranean Games gold medalists for Yugoslavia
Mediterranean Games bronze medalists for Yugoslavia
Competitors at the 1963 Mediterranean Games
Universiade medalists in tennis
Mediterranean Games medalists in tennis
Universiade gold medalists for Yugoslavia
Medalists at the 1961 Summer Universiade